Bytom (Silesian: Bytōm, Bytōń) is a city in Upper Silesia, in southern Poland. Located in the Silesian Voivodeship of Poland, the city is 7 km northwest of Katowice, the regional capital.

It is one of the oldest cities in the Upper Silesia, and the former seat of the Piast dukes of the Duchy of Bytom. Until 1532, it was in the hands of the Piast dynasty, then it belonged to the Hohenzollern dynasty. After 1623 it was a state country in the hands of the Donnersmarck family. From 1742 to 1945 the town was within the borders of Prussia and Germany, and played an important role as an economic and administrative centre of the local industrial region. Until the outbreak of World War II, it was the main centre of national, social, cultural and publishing organisations fighting to preserve Polish identity in Upper Silesia. In the interbellum and during World War II, local Poles and Jews faced persecution by Germany.

After the war, decades of the Polish People's Republic were characterized by a constant emphasis on the development of heavy industry, which deeply polluted and degraded Bytom. After 1989, the city experienced a socio-economic decline. The population has also been rapidly declining since 1999. However, it is an important place in the cultural, entertainment, and industrial map of the region.

Geology
The bedrock of the Upland of Miechowice consists primarily of sandstones and slates. The rocks are punctuated with abundant natural resources of coal and iron ore from the Carboniferous period. In the north part of the upland, in the Bytom basin lays the broad range of the triassic rocks, from sandstones to limestones, with rich ore, zinc and lead reserves. The upper layer is composed of clay, sand and gravel.

Coat of arms
One half of the coat of arms of Bytom depicts a miner mining coal, while the other half presents a yellow eagle on the blue field – the symbol of Upper Silesia.

History

Bytom is one of the oldest cities of Upper Silesia, originally recorded as Bitom in 1136, when it was part of the Medieval Kingdom of Poland. Archaeological discoveries have shown that there was a fortified settlement (a gród) here, probably founded by the Polish King Bolesław I the Brave in the early 11th century.

After the fragmentation of Poland in 1138, Bytom became part of the Seniorate Province, as it was still considered part of historic Lesser Poland. In 1177 it became part of the Silesian province of Poland, and remained within historic Silesia since. Bytom received city rights from Prince Władysław in 1254 with its first centrally located market square. The city of Bytom benefited economically from its location on a trade route linking Kraków with Silesia from east to west, and Hungary with Moravia and Greater Poland from north to south. The first Roman Catholic Church of the Virgin Mary was built in 1231. In 1259 Bytom was raided by the Mongols. The Duchy of Opole was split and in 1281 Bytom became a separate duchy, since 1289 under overlordship and administration of the Kingdom of Bohemia. It existed until 1498, when it was re-integrated with the Piast-ruled Duchy of Opole. Due to German settlers coming to the area, the city was being Germanized.

It came under the control of the Habsburg monarchy of Austria in 1526, which increased the influence of the German language. In 1683, Polish King John III Sobieski and his wife Queen Marie Casimire, visited the city, greeted by the townspeople and clergy, on the king's way to the Battle of Vienna. The city became part of the Kingdom of Prussia in 1742 during the Silesian Wars and part of the German Empire in 1871. In the 19th and the first part of the 20th centuries, the city rapidly grew and industrialized.

Bytom was one of the main centers of Polish resistance against Germanization in Upper Silesia in the 19th century, up until the mid-20th century. Polish social, political and cultural organizations were formed and operated here. From 1848, the newspaper Dziennik Górnośląski was published here. Poles smuggled large amounts of gunpowder through the city to the Russian Partition of Poland during the January Uprising in 1863. According to the Prussian census of 1905, the city of Beuthen had a population of 60,273, of which 59% spoke German, 38% spoke Polish and 3% were bilingual. In 1895, the "Sokół" Polish Gymnastic Society was established, and, during the Silesian uprisings, in 1919–1920, Polish football clubs Poniatowski Szombierki and Polonia Bytom were founded, which later on, in post-World War II Poland both won the national championship. After World War I, in the Upper Silesian plebiscite of 1921, 74.7% of the votes in Beuthen city were for Germany, and 25.3% were for Poland, due to which it remained in Germany, as part of the Province of Upper Silesia. In the interwar period, Bytom was one of two cities (alongside Kwidzyn) in Germany, in which a Polish gymnasium was allowed to operate. In 1923 a branch of the Union of Poles in Germany was established in Bytom. There was also a Polish preschool, two scout troops and a Polish bank. In a secret Sicherheitsdienst report from 1934, Bytom was named one of the main centers of the Polish movement in western Upper Silesia. Polish activists were persecuted since 1937. The Bytom Synagogue was burned down by Nazi German SS and SA troopers during the Kristallnacht on 9–10 November 1938. Before 1939, the town, along with Gleiwitz (now Gliwice), was at the southeastern tip of German Silesia.

World War II and post-war period

During the German invasion of Poland, which started World War II, the Germans carried out mass arrests of local Poles. On September 1, 1939, the day of the outbreak of the war, Adam Bożek, the chairman of the Upper Silesian district of the Union of Poles in Germany, was arrested in Bytom and then deported to the Dachau concentration camp. The Germans carried out revisions in the Polish gymnasium and the local Polish community centre, 20 Polish activists were arrested on September 4, 1939, then released and arrested again a few days later to be deported to the Buchenwald concentration camp. Also three Polish teachers, who had not yet fled, were arrested, while the assets of the Polish bank were confiscated. The Einsatzgruppe I entered the city on September 6, 1939, to commit atrocities against Poles. Many Poles were conscripted to the Wehrmacht and died on various war fronts, including 92 former students of the Polish gymnasium. The Beuthen Jewish community was liquidated via the first ever Holocaust transport to be exterminated at Auschwitz-Birkenau.

The Germans operated a Nazi prison in the city with a forced labour subcamp in the present-day Karb district. There were also multiple forced labour camps within the present-day city limits, including six subcamps of the Stalag VIII-B/344 prisoner of war camp.

In 1945 the city was transferred to Poland as a result of the Potsdam Conference. Its German population was largely expelled by the Soviet Army and the remaining indigenous Polish inhabitants were joined mostly by Poles repatriated from the eastern provinces annexed by the Soviets.

In 2017, the Tarnowskie Góry Lead-Silver-Zinc Mine and its Underground Water Management System, located mostly in the neighboring city of Tarnowskie Góry, but also partly in Bytom, was included on the UNESCO World Heritage List.

Districts

The city of Bytom is divided into 12 districts (Polish: Dzielnice), year of inclusion within the city limits in brackets:
 Śródmieście (lit. city centre/downtown)
 Rozbark (1927)
 Bobrek (1951)
 Karb (1951)
 Łagiewniki (1951)
 Miechowice (1951)
 Szombierki (1951)
 Górniki (1975)
 Osiedle gen. Jerzego Ziętka (1975), also known as Sójcze Wzgórze
 Stolarzowice (1975)
 Stroszek (1975)
 Sucha Góra (1975)

Radzionków with Rojca (currently a district of Radzionków) were located within the city limits of Bytom from 1975 until 1997.

Economy

Trade is one of the main pillars of the economy of Bytom. Being a city with long traditions of commercial trade, Bytom is fulfilling its new postindustrial role. In the centre of Bytom, and mainly around Station Street and the Market Square, is the largest concentration of registered merchants in the county.

In 2007, Bytom and its neighbours created the Upper Silesian Metropolitan Union, the largest urban centre in Poland.

Public transport

The tram routes are operated by Silesian Interurbans Tramwaje Śląskie S.A

Sport
Bytom is home to Polonia Bytom which has both a football and an ice hockey team (TMH Polonia Bytom). Its football team played in the Ekstraklasa from 2007 to 2011, winning it twice in 1954 and in 1962. The Szombierki district is home to another former Polish champion Szombierki Bytom which won the title in 1980, and is one of the oldest clubs in the region.

Culture

Bytom's cultural venues include:
 Silesian Opera – ul. Moniuszki 21/23
  (Town's Public Library)
 Dance Theatre Rozbark in Bytom
 Bytomskie Centrum Kultury (Bytom Cultural Centre)
 Kronika – Center of modern art
 City Choir of St. Grzegorz Wielki

Among Bytom's art galleries are: Galeria Sztuki Użytkowej Stalowe Anioły, Galeria "Rotunda" MBP, Galeria "Suplement", Galeria "Pod Czaplą", Galeria "Platforma", Galeria "Pod Szrtychem", Galeria Sztuki "Od Nowa 2", Galeria SPAP "Plastyka" – Galeria "Kolor", Galeria "Stowarzyszenia.Rewolucja.Art.Pl", and Galeria-herbaciarnia "Fanaberia".

Festivals
 Annual International Contemporary Dance Conference and Performance Festival
 Theatromania – Theatre Festival
 Bytom Literary Autumn
 Festival of New Music

Education

 The list of Bytom universities includes:
 Silesian University of Technology – Faculty of Transport
 Medical University of Silesia
 Polish Japanese Institute of Information Technology
 Wyższa Szkoła Ekonomii i Administracji
 Secondary schools:
 I Liceum Ogólnokształcące im. Jana Smolenia
 II Liceum Ogólnokształcące im. Stefana Żeromskiego
 IV Liceum Ogólnokształcące im. Bolesława Chrobrego
 21 other secondary schools

Politics

Bytom/Gliwice/Zabrze constituency
Members of 2001–2005 Parliament (Sejm) elected from Bytom/Gliwice/Zabrze constituency

 Jan Chojnacki, SLD-UP
 Stanisław Dulias, Samoobrona
 Andrzej Gałażewski, PO
 Ewa Janik, SLD-UP
 Józef Kubica, SLD-UP
 Wacław Martyniuk, SLD-UP
 Wiesław Okoński, SLD-UP
 Wojciech Szarama, PiS
 Krystyna Szumilas, PO
 Marek Widuch, SLD-UP

Notable people

 Grzegorz Gerwazy Gorczycki, Polish composer and musician
 Heinrich Schulz-Beuthen (1838–1915), German composer
 Siegfried Karfunkelstein (1848–1870), Prussian soldier
 Ernst Gaupp (1865–1916), German anatomist
 Ludwig Halberstädter (1876–1949), radiologist
 Adolf Kober (1879–1958), rabbi and historian
 Maximilian Kaller (1880–1947), bishop of Warmia
 Kate Steinitz (1889–1975), German-American artist and art historian 
 Hartwig von Ludwiger (1895–1947), German general 
 Max Tau (1897–1976), Jewish-German-Norwegian writer, editor and publisher
 Henry J. Leir (1900–1998), American industrialist, financier, and philanthropist
 Friedrich Domin (1902–1961), German film actor
 Herbert Büchs (1913–1996), German General
 Józef Kachel (1913–1983), head of the pre-war Polish Scouting Association in Germany
 Hans-Joachim Pancherz (1914–2008), German aviator and test pilot
 Horst Winter (1914–2001), German-Austrian jazz musician
 Leo Scheffczyk (1920–2005), German theologian and cardinal
 Bent Melchior(1929-2021) Chief Rabbi of Denmark and humanitarian.
 Haim Yavin (born 1932), Israeli news anchor
 Wolfgang Reichmann (1932–1991), German actor
 Reinhard Opitz (1934–1986), German political scientist 
 Józef Szmidt (born 1935), Polish triple jumper
 Jan Liberda (1936–2020), Polish footballer
 Wiesław Ochman (born 1937), Polish opera singer
 Jan Banaś (born 1943), Polish footballer
 Walter Winkler (1943–2014), Polish footballer
 Zygmunt Anczok (born 1946), Polish footballer
 Jerzy Konikowski (born 1947), chess player
 Leszek Engelking (born 1955), Polish poet, writer, translator and scholar
 Waldemar Legień (born 1963), Polish judoka, Olympic champion from Seoul and Barcelona
 Susanna Piontek (born 1963), writer
 Michał Probierz (born 1972), Polish football manager and former football player
 Marcin Suchański (born 1977), Polish footballer
 Marzena Godecki (born 1978), Australian actress
 Dorota Kobiela (born 1978), Polish filmmaker 
 Paul Freier (born 1979), German footballer
 Jakub Pszoniak (born 1980), Polish writer
 Marek Suker (born 1982), Polish footballer
 Gosia Andrzejewicz (born 1984), Polish pop singer
 Martyna Majok (born 1985), Polish-American playwright
 Weronika Murek (born 1989), Polish writer
 Kamil Drozd (born 1997), Polish musician

Twin towns – sister cities

Bytom is twinned with:

 Butte, United States
 Drohobych, Ukraine
 Ormož, Slovenia
 Recklinghausen, Germany
 Vsetín, Czech Republic
 Zhytomyr, Ukraine

Gallery

References

External links

Municipality of Bytom 
Old postcards from Bytom
Jewish Community in Bytom on Virtual Shtetl
Customs House of Bytom
Pictures and history of Bytom
Kino Gloria Foundation

 
Cities in Silesia
Bytom
Bytom
Holocaust locations in Poland